Mary Rosalyn Gentle (born 29 March 1956) is a UK science fiction and fantasy author.

Literary career

Mary Gentle's first published novel was Hawk in Silver (1977), a young-adult fantasy. She came to prominence with the Orthe duology, which consists of Golden Witchbreed (1983) and Ancient Light (1987).

The novels Rats and Gargoyles (1990), The Architecture of Desire (1991), and Left to His Own Devices (1994), together with several short stories, form a loosely linked series (collected in White Crow in 2003). As with Michael Moorcock's series about his antihero Jerry Cornelius, Gentle's sequence retains some basic facts about her two protagonists Valentine (also known as the White Crow) and Casaubon while changing much else about them, including what world they inhabit. Several take place in an alternate history version of 17th century and later England, where a form of Renaissance Hermetic magic has taken over the role of science. Another, Left To His Own Devices, takes place in a cyberpunk-tinged version of our own near future. The sequence is informed by historically existing ideas about esotericism and alchemy and is rife with obscure allusions to real history and literature.

Grunts! (1992) is a grand guignol parody of mass-market high fantasy novels, with orcs as heroes, murderous halflings, and racist elves.

Gentle formed part of the Midnight Rose collective in the early 1990s.

Ash: A Secret History (published in four volumes in the US) was a long science fantasy epic that won the Sidewise Award for Alternate History in 2000. Gentle has since published Ilario, set in the same timeline.

She has also written a number of erotic novels under the name Roxanne Morgan.

Bibliography

Novels 

A Hawk in Silver. London: Gollancz, 1977. 
Grunts!. London: Bantam, 1992. 
1610: A Sundial in a Grave (vt US A Sundial in a Grave: 1610). London: Gollancz, 2003. 
The Black Opera (vt UK Black Opera). San Francisco: Night Shade Books, 2012 (paper). 

Orthe series
Golden Witchbreed. London: Gollancz, 1984. 
Ancient Light. London: Gollancz, 1987. 
Orthe (omnibus edition). London: Gollancz, 2002 (paper). 

White Crow sequence
Rats and Gargoyles. London: Bantam, 1990. 
The Architecture of Desire. London: Bantam, 1991. 
Left to His Own Devices. London: Orbit, 1994 (paper). 
White Crow (omnibus edition). London: Gollancz, 2003 (paper). 

First History sequence
Ash: A Secret History (vt US). London: Gollancz, 2000. 

Ilario, A Story of the First History
Ilario: The Lion's Eye. London: Gollancz, 2006. 
Ilario: The Lion's Eye. New York: EOS, 2007. 
Ilario: The Stone Golem. New York: EOS, 2007. 

As Roxanne Morgan
Dares. London: X Libris, 1995 (paper). 
Bets. London: X Libris, 1997 (paper). 
A Game of Masks. London: X Libris, 1999 (paper). 
Who Dares, Sins. London: X Libris, 1999 (paper). 
Sinner Takes All. London: X Libris, 2000 (paper). 
Degrees of Desire. London: X Libris, 2001 (paper). 
Maximum Exposure. London: X Libris, 2004 (paper).

Short fiction 
Collections
Scholars and Soldiers London: Macdonald, 1989. 
Left to His Own Devices. London: Orbit, 1994 (paper). 
Cartomancy. London: Gollancz, 2004 (paper). 
Stories

Critical studies and reviews of Gentle's work
Lost Burgundy
 
The wild machines

Notes 
Ash: A Secret History was published in the US in four paperback volumes:
A Secret History: The Book of Ash, #1
Carthage Ascendant: The Book of Ash, #2
The Wild Machines: The Book of Ash, #3
Lost Burgundy: The Book of Ash, #4
The novella Under the Penitence was incorporated into Ilario: The Lion's Eye. The two Ilario novels were also published (UK 2006) as a single narrative, also called Ilario: The Lion's Eye .
Left to His Own Devices includes both the novel of the same name, printed for the first time, which forms part of the White Crow sequence, and also a few related and unrelated stories, some of which take place in the Weerde shared universe created by the collective Gentle belonged to, Midnight Rose.
Cartomancy puts together Gentle's short fiction unrelated to the White Crow sequence, which she included in the White Crow omnibus which also included all of the novels.

References

External links
 
 Mary Gentle at The Encyclopedia of Science Fiction

1956 births
20th-century British novelists
20th-century British women writers
21st-century British novelists
21st-century British women writers
British alternative history writers
British fantasy writers
British science fiction writers
British women novelists
Living people
Sidewise Award winners
Women historical novelists
Women science fiction and fantasy writers